John van Helden is a former football (soccer) player who represented New Zealand at international level.

Van Helden made a solitary official international appearance for New Zealand as a substitute in a 0–0 draw with Indonesia on 21 October 1980.

References 

Year of birth missing (living people)
Living people
New Zealand association footballers
New Zealand international footballers
Association football forwards